Kosmos 137 ( meaning Cosmos 137), also known as DS-U2-D No.1, was a Soviet satellite which was launched in 1966 as part of the Dnepropetrovsk Sputnik programme. It was a  spacecraft, which was built by the Yuzhnoye Design Bureau, and was used to investigate charged particles in the Earth's magnetosphere.

A Kosmos-2I 63S1 carrier rocket was used to launch Kosmos 137 into low Earth orbit. The launch took place from Site 86/1 at Kapustin Yar. The launch occurred at 13:11:59 GMT on 21 December 1966, and resulted in the successful insertion of the satellite into orbit. Upon reaching orbit, the satellite was assigned its Kosmos designation, and received the International Designator 1966-117A. The North American Air Defense Command assigned it the catalogue number 02627.

Kosmos 137 was the first of two DS-U2-D satellites to be launched, and was followed by Kosmos 219 (26 April 1968). It completed operations on 12 May 1967, before decaying from orbit and reentering the atmosphere on 23 November 1967.

See also

 1966 in spaceflight

References

Spacecraft launched in 1966
Kosmos satellites
1966 in the Soviet Union
Dnepropetrovsk Sputnik program